Catherine Dumas (born 13 July 1957) is a French politician. She was a member of the Senate of France from 2007 to 2011. She represents Paris and is a member of the Union for a Popular Movement Party.

References
Page on the Senate website (in French)

1957 births
Living people
French Senators of the Fifth Republic
Union for a Popular Movement politicians
Women members of the Senate (France)
21st-century French women politicians
Senators of Paris
The Republicans (France) politicians